Ministry of Sound Sessions Five is an electro house, dance music compilation album. It is the fifth installment of the Australian Ministry of Sound "sessions" series which started in 2004. There are 42 tracks across the two discs mixed by The Potbelleez and Goodwill. The album is the first appearance for The Potbelleez in the Sessions series and the second for Goodwill. Sessions Five finished 2008 in the number 4 position in the ARIA 2008 End Of Year Top 50 Dance Albums Charts and in position 7 of the ARIA Top 50 Compilations Chart for 2008.

Track listing
Disc 1
 Count And Sinden - "Beeper" (12" Mix)				
 PNAU - "Baby" (Aston Shuffle Remix)		
 Bass Kleph & Anthony Paul - "Helium" (Original mix)				
 Herve - "Cheap Thrills" (Original mix)				
 Meck - "So Strong" (Original mix)				
 Wilder & Clarke - "Stand Up" (Original mix)				
 Maverick & Tapesh feat. Terri B - "Rise" (Vocal Mix)				
 The Potbelleez - "Are You With Me" (Original mix)	
 The Cut Vs The Radiators - "Gimme Head" (The Cut & Nu-Tandique Mix)				
 Alex Gaudino - "Watch Out" (Nari & Milani Remix)				
 Sandy Vee - "Bleep" (Original mix)				
 Eddie Thoneick - "I Wanna Freak U" (Eddie Thoneick Classic Mix)				
 Tommy Trash - "Lover Lover" (Original mix)				
 Utah Saints - "Something Good" (Ian Carey Remix)				
 The Aston Shuffle Feat. Tommie Sunshine - "Stomp Yo Shoes" (Original mix)				
 Kid Cudi - "Day n Nite" (Crookers Remix)				
 Wiley - "Wearing My Rolex" (Club Edit)				
 Freemasons - "Uninvited" (Whelan & Di Scala Mix - AV Cheeky Re-Rub)				
 Mark Brown Feat. Sarah Cracknell - "The Journey Continues" (Thomas Gold 4am Dub)				
 Dabruck & Klein - "CARS" (Original mix)				
 Sharam - "The One" (Joachim Garraud & David Guetta Remix)				
 The Kic Pimpz - "No Stopping Us" (Original mix)

Disc 2
 Buy Now - "Body Crash" (Original mix)				
 The Presets - "This Boy's In Love" (Lifelike Remix)				
 John Dahlback - "More Than I Wanted" (Original mix)				
 Martin Solveig - "C'est La Vie" (Fedde vs Martin Club Mix)				
 The Fog - "Been A Long Time" (Laidback Luke Remix)				
 Sia - "The Girl You Lost" (Sander Van Doorn Remix)				
 Eric Prydz - "Pjanoo" (Original mix)		
 Hard-Fi - "I Shall Overcome" (Axwell Remix)				
 Pitch Dark & Sgt Slick - "I Am Ready" (Original mix)				
 Hook N Sling - "The Best Thing" (Club Mix)		
 Sydney Blu - "Give It Up For Me" (Original mix)				
 Those Usual Suspects - "Greece 2000" (The DONS & DBN Remix)				
 Afrojack - "Don't Be" (Original mix)				
 Sam Sparro - "Black & Gold" (Phones As Hard As Diamonds Edit)				
 Lid Lickers feat. Kjetil Moorland - "Lazy Love" (Hook n Sling Remix)				
 Andrea Doria vs LXR - "Beauty Of Silence" (Inpetto Remix)				
 The Migrants feat. Play Paul - "Love Song" (PoxyMusic Remix)				
 Mark Knight & Funkagenda - "Man With The Red Face" (Original mix)				
 Fred Falke - "Love Theme" (Original mix)		
 Morgan Page - "The Longest Road" (Deadmau5 Remix)

End of year charts

References

Compilation albums by Australian artists
2008 compilation albums
2008 remix albums
Dance music compilation albums
Ministry of Sound compilation albums
Ministry of Sound remix albums